The 2007 Caribbean Cup (known as the Digicel Caribbean Cup for sponsorship reasons) was the fourteenth edition of the biennial Caribbean Cup, the finals of which were contested in Trinidad and Tobago between 12 January and 23 January 2007. The four semifinalists (Cuba, Guadeloupe, Haiti, and hosts Trinidad and Tobago) qualified for the 2007 edition of the CONCACAF Gold Cup. In all, 24 of the eligible countries participated (5 did not enter and 1 withdrew).

Haiti eventually won the tournament despite having to qualify for the finals through a play-off of third-place teams from the second round and finishing second in its final-round group. Haiti beat eight-time champion and host Trinidad and Tobago in the final, although Trinidad and Tobago was missing overseas players that had helped them qualify for the 2006 FIFA World Cup. Guadeloupe were the surprise of the tournament, as former French international Jocelyn Angloma came out of retirement to help the team advance to the semifinals, qualifying for its first Gold Cup in the process. Cuba continued its development in the region by finishing in third place.

Prize money
 , as the winner, received US$120,000 (UK£64,022).
 , as the runner up, received US$70,000 (UK£37,350).
 , as the third-place team, received US$50,000 (UK£26,680).
 , as the fourth-place team, received US$30,000 (UK£16,009).
 Each of the ten host countries received a subsistence package of US$20,000 (UK£10,673).  Additionally, the host of the Digicel Caribbean Cup Final received US$150,000 (UK£80,047) to compensate for the increased costs of holding the final round of the competition.

(UK £ values calculated on 28 September 2006)

First qualifying round
 receive bye to final round.

Summary
The first round produced some notable upsets. Guyana surprised many by dominating Group A, and Surinam qualified for the second round as well. Group host Netherlands Antilles finished last by capturing a lone draw. Group B did not go to form, either; though Barbados fulfilled widely held expectations by winning, host Antigua & Barbuda produced a minor shock by also making it out of the group at the expense of St. Kitts & Nevis. St. Kitts had a late penalty kick to be taken by Atiba Harris that if made would have eliminated Antigua & Barbuda in the group's final game, but the Antiguan goalkeeper saved the penalty. Group C went to form, save only that the British Virgin Islands withdrew before group play started. Bermuda expectedly dominated the group. The shocker of the round, though occurred in Group D, where host Jamaica, widely considered the best national footballing side in the Caribbean, did not advance to the second round. Jamaica lost their second game to St. Vincent & Grenadines 2–1. Playing in the final game on the group's last day knowing they had to defeat Haiti by 3 goals to qualify, Jamaica could only muster a 2–0 victory, meaning that St. Vincent & Grenadines pulled the upset and advanced to the second round based on goals scored. Despite their loss to Jamaica, Haiti won the group based on goal differential. Host Cuba won Group E, with the Bahamas advancing as well by defeating a surprisingly competitive Turks & Caicos team. In Group F, the French departments of Martinique and host Guadeloupe carried on easily, with the host winning the group.

Group A
Played in Netherlands Antilles at Stadion Ergilio Hato.

Group B
Played in Antigua and Barbuda at Antigua Recreation Ground.

Group C
Played in United States Virgin Islands at Lionel Roberts Park.

1  withdrew due to not being able to send a team; their matches were all awarded 3–0 to their opponents.

Group D
Played in Jamaica at Independence Park.

Group E
Played in Cuba.

Group F
Played in Guadeloupe at Stade René Serge Nabajoth.

Second qualifying round
The top two teams from each first-stage group qualified for the second stage of the competition. The best third-place team from Groups G, H, and I qualified as the eighth team in the final competition. This was to have been determined by a single round-robin playoff between the three teams, to be called Group J; however, when Dominican Republic withdrew, the remaining two teams played a two-game series for the right to move on.

Summary
All three groups went largely to form. It was a wonderful round for host teams, with all three advancing and two winning their group.  Host Barbados advanced easily out of Group G, only a tie with Bermuda marring their group performance.  They were accompanied by St. Vincent and the Grenadines.  Guyana proved perfect as hosts of Group H, and Guadeloupe also did well enough to advance.  Finally, Cuba and host Martinique smashed the other two teams in Group I to move forward, with Cuba winning the group based on goal differential.  The third-place teams (Bermuda, Dominican Republic, and Haiti) were to have been drawn together in Group J.  However, Dominican Republic withdrew, leaving Bermuda and Haiti to contest a two-game set.  After achieving a 2–0 win in the first match, Haiti were overwhelming favourites in the second match.  With Haiti leading by two goals in stoppage time of the second half, a thrilling goal by Éliphène Cadet (to add to his goal in the first match) gave Haiti a 3–0 victory, a 5–0 aggregate win, and with it the final spot in the final stage.

Group G
Played in Barbados at Barbados National Stadium.

Group H
Played in Guyana at Bourda Cricket Ground.

Group I
Played in Martinique at Stade d'Honneur de Dillon.

Group J
, as the winner of the series, advanced to the finals. The matches were played at the Ato Boldon Stadium in Trinidad and Tobago.

Final tournament

First round
 qualified as host.  and  qualified from Group G.   and  qualified from Group H.   and  qualified from Group I.   qualified from the Playoff.

The groups were named after two former Trinidad and Tobago players.

Sedley Joseph Group
Hasely Crawford Stadium, Port of Spain, Trinidad and Tobago

Bobby Sookram Group
Manny Ramjohn Stadium, Marabella, Trinidad and Tobago

Semi finals

Third Place Playoff

Final

Result

Qualifiers for the 2007 CONCACAF Gold Cup

Top scorers

References

External links
Digicel Caribbean Cup 2007 Official Site
Caribbean Cup 2007 on CONCACAF Website
Digicel Cup 2007 at RSSSF

Caribbean Cup
Carib
International association football competitions hosted by Trinidad and Tobago
2006–07 in Caribbean football